Gumercindo Gomez (21 January 1907– 31 January 1980) was a Bolivian football striker.

Career 
During his career he has made one appearance for the Bolivia national team at the 1930 FIFA World Cup. 
His career in club football was spent in Oruro Royal between 1929 and 1931.

References

External links

1907 births
1980 deaths
Association football forwards
Bolivian footballers
Bolivia international footballers
1930 FIFA World Cup players